The Sri Lankan Telugus are an ethnic group from Sri Lanka who trace their origins to Telugu-speaking regions centuries ago. They are commonly known in English as Sri Lankan Gypsies, in Sinhala as Ahikuntaka, and in Tamil as Kuravar. However, these terms are considered as offensive by the community, who call themselves as Telugu. They are the only nomadic group of people living in Sri Lanka. They live in small palmyra huts for approximately one week in one place. Their ancestral language is a dialect of Telugu, though most now speak Sinhala or Tamil. Various governments, NGOs and missionary societies have made attempts to settle them down, and thus some are settled in villages. Their traditional occupations are fortune telling, snake charming and training monkeys and dogs for performances, though modernisation has forced many into wage labour. Those who are settled in resettlement villages are subsistence farmers and farm hands to other farmers. They also speak Sinhalese or Tamil based on their area of settlement. Most seem to be settled in the eastern Batticaloa district. The traditional faith is a form of Shaivism, though many are now converting to Buddhism and some Christianity. According to a 2017 survey by the Government of Sri Lanka, their population is ~4,000.

References

External links 
Ahikuntika: Sri Lankan gypsy clan
The gypsy who stayed

Telugu people
Nomadic groups in Eurasia
Indians in Sri Lanka